Babesiidae is a family of protists belonging to the order Piroplasmida.

Genera:
 Babesia Starcovivi, 1893
 Echinozoon Garnham, 1951

References

Piroplasmida